Lady Seongmu of the Pyeongsan Bak clan was the daughter of Bak Ji-yun, one of Wang Geon's helper in founding the new Goryeo dynasty who became the 26th wife of Taejo of Goryeo. She bore him 4 sons and a daughter who later married King Gyeongsun of Silla, but all of her sons died young without left any issue. Since both of Bak Su-mun (박수문) and Bak Su-gyeong (박수경) were her brothers, she then became the aunt of her husband's 28th and 29th wife.

References

External links
성무부인 on Encykorea (in Korean).

Year of birth unknown
Year of death unknown
Consorts of Taejo of Goryeo
People from North Hwanghae